This is a dynamic list of geothermal hot springs (onsen) as geological phenomena in Japan. This list is not for listing commercial establishments such as spa hotels, onsen ryokan, healing centers or other commercial establishments.

Japan has many geothermal spring systems as it is located in the Pacific Ring of Fire volcanic area. More than 27,000 hot spring sources exist in Japan, together they discharge over 2.6 million liters of water every minute.

These springs have played, and continue to play, an important role in Japanese culture throughout history. In Shinto, Sukunabikona is the kami of the hot springs. As the deity of hot springs Sukunabikona and Ōkuninushi went to the Dōgo hot springs. There Ōkuninushi put Sukunabikona in the hot spring water to heal him of an ailment. Upon awakening, Sukunabikona danced atop a stone. It is said that his footprints left impressions on the rock, known as Tamanoishi, which still exists at Dogo Onsen north of the main building.

Akita Prefecture

 Akinomiya Hot Springs
 Nyūtō Onsen
 Ōfuka Onsen
 Takanoyu Onsen also known as Falcon's Hot Spring
 Tamagawa Hot Spring is tied (with Higashi Onsen in Kagoshima) for the highest acid content of all hot springs in Japan, at a PH value of 1.2.
 Tsurunoyu Onsen

Aomori Prefecture
 Asamushi Onsen
 Furofushi Onsen
 Kappa-no-you Hot Spring
 Oku-yagen Hot Spring
 Sukayu Onsen
 Yagen Onsen

Ehime Prefecture
 Dōgo Onsen was mentioned in the oldest collection of Japanese poetry, the Man’yo Wakashu.

Fukui Prefecture
 Awara Onsen, Awara

Fukushima Prefecture
 , Nihonmatsu, Fukushima
 Iizaka Onsen
 Iwaki Yumoto Onsen
 Sabakoyu Onsen
 Takayu Onsen
 Tsuchiyu Onsen

Gifu Prefecture
 , Gero, Gifu, Hida River
 , Takayama
 Nagaragawa Onsen

Gunma Prefecture

 Akagi, Gunma
 , Ikaho, a.k.a. Ikaho Onsen, Kogane-no-Yu (The Golden Waters), Kodakara-no-Yu (Child Waters)
 Kusatsu Onsen
 Sawatari Hot Springs
 Rosoku Onsen has the highest radium content in all of Japan., also known as Yunoshima Radium Kosen Hoyojo (Rosoku Onsen) (有限会社 湯之島ラジウム鉱泉保養所)
 Shima Onsen
 Takaragawa Onsen

Hokkaido Prefecture
Hokkaido Prefecture has the third most hot springs with 2,304 registered. The hot springs in the prefecture have the second highest discharge rate of water at 260 kiloliters per minute.
 Asahidake Onsen
 Futamata
 
 Kamuiwakka Falls
 Noboribetsu Jigokudani, or Hell Valley, the main source of the Noboribetsu onsen
 
 Onnetō Hot Falls
 
 Tenninkyo Onsen
 Tōyako, Hokkaidō, Shikotsu-Toya National Park
 Yunokawa Onsen

Hyōgo Prefecture

 Arima Onsen, Kobe, was mentioned in the Nihon Shoki, the second oldest account of the history of Japan (after the history presented in Kojiki)
 Kinosaki, Hyōgo
 Takarazuka, Hyōgo
 Yumura Onsen, (Shin'onsen, Hyōgo) Yumura Onsen has the hottest water in Japan with a temperature of 208.4 degrees Fahrenheit (98 degrees Celsius).

Ishikawa Prefecture
 Awazu Onsen, Komatsu, Ishikawa
 , Kaga, Ishikawa
 Wakura Onsen, Nanao
 Yamanaka Onsen, Kaga
 Yamashiro Onsen, Kaga
 Yuwaku Onsen

Iwate Prefecture
 Geto Onsen
 Hanamaki, Iwate
 Kindaichi Onsen

Kagawa Prefecture
 Naoshima

Kanagawa Prefecture
 Hakone, Kanagawa, near Tokyo. See also Ōwakudani
 Iiyama Onsen and one other hot spring (Tokigawa Onsen in Saitama Prefecture) are tied for the highest alkalinity in all of Japan.
 Miyanoshita Onsen
  Tsurumaki Onsen has the highest calcium content in its waters of all the hot springs in Japan.
 Yugawara

Kagoshima Prefecture
Kagoshima prefecture has the second most hot springs in Japan, with 2,824 registered. The hot springs systems in Kagoshima have the third highest discharge rate at 201 kiloliters per minute.
 Higashi Onsen and one other hot spring (Tamagawa Onsen in Akita) have the highest acidity content in its water at a PH value of 1.2, of all the hot springs in Japan.
 Ibusuki Onsen
 Kirishima

Kyoto Prefecture
 Funaoka Onsen, Kyoto

Kumamoto Prefecture

 Aso, Kumamoto, Mount Aso
 Kurokawa Onsen, Aso
 Nuruyu Onsen

Mie Prefecture
 Yunoyama Onsen

Miyagi Prefecture
 Naruko
 Sakan Onsen
 Sakunami Onsen

Nagano Prefecture

 Honzawa Onsen has the highest elevation for an open-air onsen, at 2,150 meters.
 Jigokudani
 
 Shibu
 
 Suwa
 Asama Onsen

Nagasaki Prefecture

 Obama Onsen supposedly the hottest Japanese hot spring
 Shimabara, Nagasaki
 Unzen Onsen

Niigata Prefecture
 Iwamuro, Niigata
 
 
 
 Yuzawa, Niigata

Okayama Prefecture
 , Okayama Prefecture at the foot of Yubara dam
 Yunogo Onsen, Okayama Prefecture

Ōita Prefecture

Oita is the prefecture with the most geothermal spring sources in Japan, 4,788 are registered. The prefecture also has the highest discharge rate of 296 kiloliters per minute
 Beppu Onsen, Hells of Beppu,  Beppu, Ōita Prefecture
 Kankaiji Onsen
 Nagayu Onsen has the highest level of carbon dioxide of any hot spring in the world.
 Yufuin, Ōita Prefecture

Saga Prefecture
 Tara, Saga

Saitama Prefecture
 Tokigawa Onsen and one other hot spring (Iiyama Onsen in Kanagawa Prefecture) are tied for first place for the highest alkalinity in the water.

Shimane Prefecture
 Tamatsukuri Onsen is mentioned in the Izumo no Kuni Fudoki (Chronicle of the Land of Izumo) from the year, 733.

Shizuoka Prefecture

 , Atami
 
 Itō, Shizuoka
 
 Minami-Alps Akaishi Onsen Shirakaba-so
 Mine Onsen, Daifunto Park Kawazu town. (Dai funto park) Kawazu, Shizuoka
 Shuzenji Onsen

Tochigi Prefecture
 Kinugawa Onsen, Tochigi

Tottori Prefecture
 Hawai Onsen
 , Yonago, Tottori
 , Misasa
 Tōgō Onsen

Toyama Prefecture
 Mikuriga-ike Onsen has the highest elevation of all hot springs in Japan, with an elevation of 2,400 meters.
 Unazuki Onsen, Kurobe

Wakayama Prefecture

 , Tanabe, Wakayama
 Nanki-Katsuura Onsen, Nachikatsuura, Wakayama
 Nanki-Shirahama Onsen, Shirahama
 Ryujin Onsen, Tanabe, Wakayama
 Tsubaki Onsen
 Yunomine Onsen, Tanabe, Wakayama, site of the UNESCO World Heritage Tsuboyu bath

Yamagata Prefecture
 Akayu, Yamagata
 Ginzan Onsen, Obanazawa
 Zaō Onsen

Yamanashi Prefecture

Other locations
 Kaniyu Onsen
 Okukinu hot springs group
 Sashiusudake [Baransky] hot springs - in disputed territory between Japan & Russia

See also
 List of hot springs in the United States
 List of hot springs in the world
 Sentō
 Onsen

References

Further Reading
Ishizu, Risaku. The Mineral Springs of Japan (1915), published by Sankyo Kabushiki Kaisha, Tokyo Imperial Hygienic Laboratory for the Panama-Pacific International Exposition

External links

 Sento Guide Guide to public baths in Japan
 Japan Onsen A mountain onsen guide of the Japan Alps

Hot springs
Hot springs
Geothermal areas
Balneotherapy